High Speed is a 1924 American silent comedy film directed by Herbert Blaché and starring Herbert Rawlinson, Carmelita Geraghty and Bert Roach.

Synopsis
Hi Moreland attempts to win the hand of Marjory, the daughter of a bank president, in the face of stiff competition from a wealthy rival who is approved of by her father.

Cast
 Herbert Rawlinson as Hi Moreland
 Carmelita Geraghty as Marjory Holbrook
 Bert Roach as Dick Farrell
 Otto Hoffman as Daniel Holbrook
 Percy Challenger as Rev. Percy Humphries
 Jules Cowles as Burglar
 Cleo Bartlett as 	Susanna
 Buck Russellas Taxi Driver
 Helen Broderick as Minor role

References

Bibliography
 Connelly, Robert B. The Silents: Silent Feature Films, 1910-36, Volume 40, Issue 2. December Press, 1998.
 Munden, Kenneth White. The American Film Institute Catalog of Motion Pictures Produced in the United States, Part 1. University of California Press, 1997.

External links
 

1924 films
1924 comedy films
1920s English-language films
American silent feature films
Silent American comedy films
Films directed by Herbert Blaché
American black-and-white films
Universal Pictures films
1920s American films